In His Majesty's Prison Service, a local prison is a type of prison where a person is detained before a trial or directly after a conviction.

As of 2012, operational local prisons in England and Wales for male prisoners  are:
 Altcourse
 Bedford
 Birmingham
 Bristol
 Chelmsford
 Doncaster
 Dorchester
 Exeter
 HM Prison Forest Bank
 Gloucester
 High Down
 HM Prison Holme House
 Hull
 HM Prison Latchmere House
 Leeds
 Leicester
 Lewes
 Leyhill
 Lincoln
 Liverpool
 Nottingham
 Parc
 Pentonville
 Preston
 Ranby
 Shrewsbury
 Wandsworth
 Winchester
 Wormwood Scrubs
 HM Prison Wymott.

As of 2012, operational local prisons in England and Wales for female prisoners  are:

 Bronzefield
 Eastwood Park
 Foston Hall
 Holloway
 New Hall.

References

Imprisonment and detention
Prisons
Penal system in the United Kingdom